For a complete list of Algerian clubs, see :Category:Football clubs in Algeria.

In Algeria, there are more than 1000 football clubs that compete in the Algerian football league system; this is an African and Arab record.  
An incomplete list:

List of clubs sorted by region

West region

Center region

East region

South-west region

South-east region

Defunct clubs

External links 
Club Soccer - Algeria
RSSSF.COM
DZFOOT.COM

Algeria
Clubs
 
Football clubs